Brandon Wimbush (born December 17, 1996, in Teaneck, New Jersey) is a former American football quarterback who played for Notre Dame and UCF.

Early years
Wimbush, a resident of Teaneck, New Jersey, attended St. Peter's Preparatory School in Jersey City. As a senior, he was named the Gatorade Football Player of the Year for New Jersey after he completed 192 of 265 passes for 3,187 yards, 37 touchdowns and four interceptions, while rushing for an additional 723 yards and 5 more touchdowns. Wimbush was considered one of the top quarterback recruits in his class and committed to the University of Notre Dame to play college football.

College career

Notre Dame

2015–2016 
As a freshman in 2015, Wimbush appeared in two games as a backup to DeShone Kizer. In 2016, he took a redshirt season.

2017 
With Kizer in the NFL, Wimbush took over as Notre Dame's starting quarterback in 2017 as a redshirt sophomore. In his first start for the Fighting Irish, Wimbush threw for 184 yards, two passing touchdowns, and an interception against Temple. He also gained 106 yards on the ground and had a rushing touchdown in the game. Two weeks later, he had 207 rushing yards and four rushing touchdowns to go along with 96 passing yards in a 49–20 victory over Boston College. Wimbush had 110 rushing yards and a career-high 280 passing yards against Wake Forest on November 4. In Notre Dame's bowl game against LSU, Wimbush was benched in the second quarter in favor of backup Ian Book, who led Notre Dame to a come-from-behind victory, 21–17.

2018 
Wimbush again started for Notre Dame in the 2018 season. Although, after a shaky start to the beginning of the season, backup Ian Book took over in Week 4. Wimbush relieved an injured Ian Book against Florida State later in the season in what would be his last game for Notre Dame .

College statistics

References

External links
Notre Dame Fighting Irish bio

1996 births
Living people
Players of American football from New Jersey
American football quarterbacks
Notre Dame Fighting Irish football players
People from Teaneck, New Jersey
Sportspeople from Bergen County, New Jersey
St. Peter's Preparatory School alumni
UCF Knights football players